"Just Us 2" (stylized Just us 2) is a song recorded by South Korean duo Exo-SC, the second official sub-unit of the South Korean boy group Exo. It was released on July 22, 2019 by SM Entertainment as one of the three title tracks of their first extended play What a Life.

Background and release 
"Just Us 2" is hip hop track featuring an addictive piano theme and, soft-feeling synthesizers and cool melodies, with lyrics that portrays the landscape of hot summer vacations spot. The track features rapper Gaeko and was composed by the South Korean artist Gray, he also took part in writing the lyrics of the song along with Boi B, Chanyeol and Sehun.

On July 31, a cam video of the two members separately of their performance of "Just Us 2" on their showcase were released.

Music video 
On July 18, a teaser of "Just Us 2" was released along with the other two title tracks of What a Life EP. On July 20, the official music video of "Just Us 2" was release prior to the album's release. The music video shows the duo and the producers of the song in the studio recording and composing the song.

Live performance 
On July 22, EXO-SC and Gaeko performed "Just Us 2" at their showcase.

Charts

Release history

References 

2019 songs
2019 singles
Korean-language songs
SM Entertainment singles